Gallup, Inc. is an American analytics and advisory company based in Washington, D.C. Founded by George Gallup in 1935, the company became known for its public opinion polls conducted worldwide. Starting in the 1980s, Gallup transitioned its business to focus on providing analytics and management consulting to organizations globally. In addition to its analytics, management consulting, and Gallup Poll, the company also offers educational consulting, the CliftonStrengths assessment and associated products, and business and management books published by its Gallup Press unit.

Organization
Gallup is a private, employee-owned company based in Washington, D.C. Its headquarters is located at The Gallup Building. It maintains between 30 and 40 offices globally, including offices at the Gallup Riverfront Campus in Omaha, Nebraska, and has about 2,000 employees. Jon Clifton is Gallup's CEO.

Gallup, Inc. has no affiliation with Gallup International, sometimes referred to as Gallup International Association or GIA. Gallup has sued Gallup International and other organizations for the unauthorized use of the Gallup name.

History

Early history

George Gallup (1901–1984) founded the American Institute of Public Opinion, the precursor of the Gallup Organization, in Princeton, New Jersey, in 1935. Gallup attempted to make his company's polls fair by sampling demographics representative of each state's voters. Gallup also refused to conduct surveys commissioned by organizations such as the Republican and Democratic parties, a position the company has continued to hold.

In 1936, Gallup successfully predicted that Franklin Roosevelt would defeat Alfred Landon for the U.S. presidency in direct contradiction to the popular The Literary Digest; this event popularized the company and made it a leader in American polling. In 1938, Gallup began conducting market research for advertising companies and the film industry.

By 1948, Gallup's company established polling organizations in a dozen other countries and Gallup's polls were syndicated in newspapers in the U.S. and abroad. The modern Gallup Organization formed in 1958, when George Gallup grouped all of his polling operations into one organization.

Since George Gallup's death
George Gallup died in 1984. Four years later, his family sold the firm for an undisclosed price to Selection Research, Incorporated (SRI), a research firm in Omaha, Nebraska. The family's involvement with the business continued; sons George Gallup Jr. and Alec Gallup kept their positions as co-chairmen and directors. George Gallup Jr. (1930–2011) established the nonprofit George H. Gallup Foundation as part of the acquisition agreement. SRI, founded in 1969 by the psychologist Don Clifton, focused on market research and personnel selection; it pioneered the use of talent-based structured psychological interviews. Acquiring the Gallup name gave SRI more credibility and higher response rates.

Following its sale to SRI, Gallup repositioned itself as a research and management consulting company that works with businesses to identify and address issues with employees and their customers. Gallup continues to conduct and report on public polls. While the Gallup Poll generates relatively smaller portion of revenue for the company, it helps the company maintain visibility.

In the 1990s, Gallup developed a set of 12 questions it called Q12 (also known as 12: The Elements of Great Managing) to help businesses gauge employee engagement, it entered partnerships to conduct polls for USA Today and CNN, and launched its Clifton StrengthsFinder online assessment tool. In 1999, Gallup analysts wrote First, Break All the Rules, a bestselling book on management. Fortune Small Business wrote that the success of the book bolstered Gallup's consulting business.

In 2012, Gallup incorrectly predicted that Mitt Romney would win the 2012 U.S. presidential election. Following the results of the election, Gallup spent six months reviewing its methodology. The company concluded that its methodology was flawed as it made too few phone calls in Eastern and Pacific time zones, overestimated the white vote, and relied on listed landline phones that skewed the sample to an older demographic.

In July 2013, the United States Department of Justice and Gallup reached a $10.5 million settlement based upon allegations that the company violated the False Claims Act and the Procurement Integrity Act. The complaint alleged that Gallup overstated its labor hours in proposals to the U.S. Mint and State Department for contracts and task orders to be awarded without competition. The Department of Justice alleged that the agencies awarded contracts and task orders at falsely inflated prices. The settlement also resolved allegations that Gallup engaged in improper employment negotiations with a then-Federal Emergency Management Agency (FEMA) official, Timothy Cannon, for work and funding. Michael Lindley, a former Gallup employee, originally made the allegations against Gallup under the False Claims Act. Lindley received nearly $2 million of the settlement. Under the settlement, there was no prosecution and no determination of liability.

Gallup decided not to conduct horse-race polling of the 2016 U.S. presidential election to help Gallup focus on its consulting business. Gallup officials said polling could still be accurate during the election, but the company decided to reallocate resources. Gallup Editor-in-Chief Frank Newport told The Washington Post said Gallup felt polling the public on issues was a better use of resources.

Gallup Poll

Polling in the United States

The Gallup Poll is the division of Gallup that regularly conducts public opinion polls. Gallup Poll results, analysis, and videos are published daily in the form of data-driven news. Conducting polls brings the company financial losses of about $10 million a year, but gives Gallup company the visibility of a well-known brand, which helps promote its corporate research.

Historically, the Gallup Poll has measured and tracked the public's attitudes concerning political, social, and economic issues, including sensitive or controversial subjects.

Gallup Daily tracking methodology
Gallup Daily tracking is made up of two surveys: the Gallup U.S. Daily political and economic survey and the Gallup–Healthways Well-Being Index. For both surveys, Gallup conducts 500 interviews across the U.S. per day, 350 days out of the year, with 70% on cellphones and 30% on landlines. Gallup Daily tracking methodology relies on live interviewers, dual-frame random-digit-dial sampling (which includes landline as well as cellular telephone phone sampling to reach those in cell phone-only households), and uses a multi-call design to reach respondents not contacted on the initial attempt.

The population of the U.S. that relied only on cell phones was 34% in 2012.

The findings from Gallup's U.S. surveys are based on the organization's standard national telephone samples, consisting of list-assisted random-digit-dial (RDD) telephone samples using a proportionate, stratified sampling design. A computer randomly generates the phone numbers Gallup calls from all working phone exchanges (the first three numbers of your local phone number) and not-listed phone numbers; thus, Gallup is as likely to call unlisted phone numbers as well as listed phone numbers.

Within each contacted household reached via landline, an interview is sought with an adult 18 years of age or older living in the household who will have the next birthday.  Gallup does not use the same respondent selection procedure when making calls to cell phones because they are typically associated with one individual rather than shared among several members of a household. Gallup Daily tracking includes Spanish-language interviews for Spanish-speaking respondents and interviews in Alaska and Hawaii.

When respondents to be interviewed are selected at random, every adult has an equal probability of falling into the sample. The typical sample size for a Gallup poll, either a traditional stand-alone poll or one night's interviewing from Gallup's Daily tracking, is 1,000 national adults with a margin of error of ±4 percentage points. Gallup's Daily tracking process now allows Gallup analysts to aggregate larger groups of interviews for more detailed subgroup analysis. But the accuracy of the estimates derived only marginally improves with larger sample sizes.

After Gallup collects and processes survey data, each respondent is assigned a weight so that the demographic characteristics of the total weighted sample of respondents match the latest estimates of the demographic characteristics of the adult population available from the U.S. Census Bureau. Gallup weights data to census estimates for gender, race, age, educational attainment, and region.

The data are weighted daily by number of adults in the household and the respondents' reliance on cell phones, to adjust for any disproportion in selection probabilities. The data are then weighted to compensate for nonrandom nonresponse, using targets from the U.S. Census Bureau for age, region, gender, education, Hispanic ethnicity, and race. The resulting sample represents an estimated 95% of all U.S. households.

Accuracy

From 1936 to 2008, Gallup Polls correctly predicted the winner of the presidential election with the notable exceptions of the 1948 Thomas Dewey–Harry S. Truman election, where nearly all pollsters predicted a Dewey victory (which also led to the infamous Dewey Defeats Truman headline), and 1976, when they inaccurately projected a slim victory by Gerald Ford over Jimmy Carter.  For the 2008 U.S. presidential election, Gallup correctly predicted the winner, but was rated 17th out of 23 polling organizations in terms of the precision of its pre-election polls relative to the final results.

In 2012, Gallup's final election survey had Mitt Romney at 49% and Barack Obama at 48%, compared to the final election results showing Obama with 51.1% to Romney's 47.2%.  Poll analyst Nate Silver found that Gallup's results were the least accurate of the 23 major polling firms Silver analyzed, having the highest incorrect average of being 7.2 points away from the final result.  Frank Newport, the editor-in-chief of Gallup, responded to the criticism by stating that Gallup simply makes an estimate of the national popular vote rather than predicting the winner and that their final poll was within the statistical margin of error. Newport also criticized analysts such as Silver who aggregate and analyze other people's polls, stating that "It's much easier, cheaper, and mostly less risky to focus on aggregating and analyzing others' polls."

In 2012, poll analyst Mark Blumenthal criticized Gallup for a slight but routine under-weighting of black and Hispanic Americans that led to an approximately 2% shift of support away from Barack Obama. At the same time, Blumenthal commended Gallup for its "admirable commitment to transparency" and suggested that other polling firms disclose their raw data and methodologies.

In 2013, the accuracy of Gallup polling on religious faith was questioned. Gallup's polling on religiosity in the U.S. has produced results somewhat different from other studies on religious issues, including a 2012 study by the Pew Research Center, which found that those who lack a religious affiliation were a fast-growing demographic group in the U.S.

In 2016, The Wall Street Journal published a comparison of Gallup's survey-based measurement of unemployment with the same estimate from the U.S. Bureau of Labor Statistics (BLS) from 2010 to 2016. The numbers almost exactly match and the trend is highly correlated, despite a larger sample size from the BLS, suggesting Gallup design and weighting methods generate estimates consistent with government agencies.

Gallup World Poll
In 2005, Gallup began its World Poll, which continually surveys citizens in 160 countries, representing more than 98% of the world's adult population. The Gallup World Poll consists of more than 100 global questions as well as region-specific items. It includes the following global indexes: law and order, food and shelter, institutions and infrastructure, good jobs, wellbeing, and brain gain. Gallup also works with organizations, cities, governments, and countries to create custom items and indexes to gather information on specific topics of interest.

Gallup World Poll methodology
Gallup interviews approximately 1,000 residents per country. The target population is the entire civilian, non-institutionalized population, aged 15 and older. Gallup asks each respondent the survey questions in his or her own language to produce statistically comparable results. Gallup uses telephone surveys in countries where telephone coverage represents at least 80% of the population. Where telephone penetration is less than 80%, Gallup uses face-to-face interviewing.

Services
Gallup is known for its Gallup Poll, but the bulk of the firm's business and revenue is derived from its other research and management consulting services, which include an employee engagement survey called Q12, and a personality assessment called CliftonStrengths. The Q12 employee engagement survey asks employees 12 questions about their workplace, coworkers, and management, to measure engagement and help managers and organizations improve productivity. CliftonStrengths, formerly called StrengthsFinder, is an online personality-assessment tool that focuses on 34 themes that make up the user's personality; Gallup uses the tool as part of its consulting. For K–12 education, Gallup consults and trains schools and school systems to focus on strengths and increase engagement. The company administers the Gallup Student Poll in the U.S., which measures success based on hope, engagement, and well-being.

Gallup Press
Gallup's in-house publishing division, Gallup Press, has published approximately 30 books on business and personal well-being-related themes. Titles include: First, Break All the Rules: What the World's Greatest Managers Do Differently; How Full Is Your Bucket?, written by Gallup senior scientist Tom Rath and his grandfather, Don Clifton, founder of SRI; and Now, Discover Your Strengths, updated to a new version called StrengthsFinder 2.0 in 2007, which is among Amazon's 20 bestselling books of all-time as of 2017.

See also
 Gallup's most admired man and woman poll
 Gallup's List of Most Widely Admired People of the 20th Century
 George H. Gallup House

References

Further reading
 Cantril, Hadley. Gauging Public Opinion (1944) online.

 Cantril, Hadley and Mildred Strunk, eds. Public Opinion, 1935–1946 (1951), massive compilation of many public opinion polls online 

 Converse, Jean M. Survey Research in the United States: Roots and Emergence 1890–1960  (1987)
 Gallup, George, ed. The Gallup Poll: Public Opinion, 1935–1971 (3 vol 1972), compilation of reports on thousands of Gallup polls.
 Gallup, George. Public Opinion in a Democracy (1939),
 Gallup, George. The Sophisticated Poll Watcher's Guide (1972)
 Moore, David W. The Superpollsters: How They Measure and Manipulate Public Opinion in America (1995) online edition
 Roll Jr., Charles W. and Albert H. Cantril; Polls: Their Use and Misuse in Politics (1972) online edition

External links
 

Gallup Organization, The
Gallup Organization, The
Gallup Organization, The
Gallup Organization, The
Gallup